Kağızman, formerly Kaghzvan, is a town and district of Kars Province in the Eastern Anatolia region of Turkey.

The population was 23,100 in 2012. The current mayor is Nevzat Yıldız (MHP), and the Kaymakam is İshak Çınar.

The town was the administrative center of the Kagizman Okrug of the Kars Oblast until 1918.

Notable people
Rohat Alakom, writer

References

Towns in Turkey
Populated places in Kars Province
Districts of Kars Province
Kars Oblast
Kurdish settlements in Turkey